The James Gatschene Memorial Trophy was awarded annually to the International Hockey League player selected as most valuable through his display of outstanding playing ability and sportsmanlike conduct over the course of the regular season, as chosen by the league coaches.

The trophy was first presented at the close of the 1946–1947 season by workers of the Chrysler factory in Windsor, Ontario, as a memorial to Gatschene, a former Chrysler employee and hockey star in the Windsor-Detroit area. Gatschene was a member of the Canadian Forces, killed in action during World War II.

Winners

References
James Gatschene Memorial Trophy www.hockeydb.com
James Gatschene Memorial Trophy www.azhockey.com

International Hockey League (1945–2001) trophies